George Tomline (3 March 1813 – 25 August 1889), referred to as Colonel Tomline, was an English politician who served as Member of Parliament (MP) for various constituencies. He was the son of William Edward Tomline and grandson of George Pretyman Tomline.

Life
Tomline was baptised on 1 June 1813 at St. Margaret's, Westminster by his grandfather the Bishop of Lincoln.

He was educated at Eton College, following which he made a Grand Tour in Europe mostly travelling in a gig.

He succeeded to his father's estates, at Riby Grove, Lincolnshire, and Orwell Park, Suffolk, in 1836, and he also inherited through his mother, Frances (nee Amler or Ambler), Ford Hall near Shrewsbury, Shropshire. He was Colonel of the Royal North Lincolnshire Militia.

He was Member of Parliament for:
Sudbury (1840–1841 - as Conservative);
Shrewsbury (1841–1847 - as Conservative, alongside Benjamin Disraeli) and (1852–1868 - as Liberal);
Great Grimsby (1868–1874, as Liberal).

In parliament he was well known as an advocate of bi-metallism in currency and for posting silver bars to successive Chancellors of the Exchequer, demanding the Royal Mint had a duty to convert them into coinage. While ‘out of office’ between 1847 and 1852 Tomline purchased the Orwell Park estate.

In 1881 he unsuccessfully contested a by-election in North Lincolnshire as a Liberal.

He was High Sheriff of Lincolnshire for 1852.

He was a keen amateur astronomer who built an observatory at Orwell Park.
He was founder and chairman of the Felixstowe Railway and Pier Company which built the Felixstowe Branch Line and established the Port of Felixstowe. Tomline Road in Ipswich which runs parallel to the railway line is named after him.

He died, unmarried, from a stroke after a long illness at his London home, Number 1 Carlton House Terrace on 25 August 1889, aged 76. After a funeral service at St Martin's in the Fields on 29 August, his body was cremated at Woking Crematorium and his ashes sent to London.

His heir, to whom his estates devolved, was the Rt Hon. Captain Ernest George Pretyman MP, at various times Parliamentary Under-Secretary to the Board of Trade, and Civil Lord of the Admiralty.

Tomline Prize
In 1836, Eton College appointed its first Mathematical Master, Mr Stephen Hawtrey, and Tomline promoted the study of this subject by donating money for the mathematics prize: the first recipient was Matthew Piers Watt Boulton in 1837. The long-standing informal arrangement was formalized in 1854 by a deed in which a sum somewhat in excess of £1000 was granted for the purposes of a scholarship. The prize was open to the whole school and the winner (known as the Tomline Prizeman) received £30 worth of books.

Several winners of the Tomline Prize were notable in a mathematical field, including Norman Macleod Ferrers (1846), Philip Herbert Cowell (1886), G.H.J. Hurst (1887 - 2nd Wrangler and Fellow of King's), John Maynard Keynes (1901), J. B. S. Haldane (1909),  T.H.R. Skyrme (1939), Peter Swinnerton-Dyer (1943), Robin Milner (1952), Luke Hodgkin (1956 - Mathematics, King's College London), John Pryce (1957 - Emeritus Professor of Mathematics, Cardiff) and Warren Li (2016 - Senior Wrangler in 2019).  The prize has been awarded annually as the principal mathematics prize at Eton since 1837 (with a hiatus between 1977 and 1987); since 2010, candidates for the prize must write an extended mathematical essay and are called on to defend it viva voce.

References

Bibliography
Allen, David, 'Victorian Suffolk's Great Eccentric: Colonel George Tomline 1813-1889', Proceedings of the Suffolk Institute of Archaeology and History 41, Part 1 (2005), 79-102.

 

Gowing, R. Shave (1875) "George Tomline", in Public Men of Ipswich and East Suffolk Ipswich:Scopes and London:Grant & Co, 103–109.

Obituaries
Eddowes's Shrewsbury Journal, 28 August 1889
Lincolnshire Chronicle, 30 August 1889
Ipswich Journal, 30 August 1889
Shrewsbury Chronicle, 30 August 1889

External links 
 

1813 births
1889 deaths
People educated at Eton College
UK MPs 1837–1841
UK MPs 1841–1847
UK MPs 1852–1857
UK MPs 1857–1859
UK MPs 1859–1865
UK MPs 1865–1868
UK MPs 1868–1874
Liberal Party (UK) MPs for English constituencies
Conservative Party (UK) MPs for English constituencies
19th-century British astronomers
British Life Guards officers
High Sheriffs of Lincolnshire
Members of the Parliament of the United Kingdom for Great Grimsby